Robert Blake (born Michael James Gubitosi; September 18, 1933 – March 9, 2023), billed early in his career as Mickey Gubitosi and Bobby Blake, was an American prolific Golden Globe and Emmy Award winning actor, who appeared in some 200 films. He was best known for starring in the 1967 film In Cold Blood and playing the title role in the late 1970s television series Baretta.

Blake began his career in the 1930s performing as a child alongside his family in song and dance, but became famous as a child actor, with his lead role in the final years of the Metro-Goldwyn-Mayer-era of the Our Gang (Little Rascals) short film series from 1939 to 1944. He also appeared as a child actor in 22 entries of the Red Ryder film franchise. In the Red Ryder series and in many of his adult roles, the Italian-American actor was often cast as an American Indian or Latino character. After a stint in the United States Army, Blake returned to acting in both television and movie roles. Blake continued acting until 1997's Lost Highway.  Owing to Blake becoming one of the first child actors to successfully transition to mature roles as an adult, author Michael Newton called his career "one of the longest in Hollywood history."

Blake's later career unravelled in what was called an O.J. Simpson style case, in March 2005, with Blake being criminally tried, but acquitted of the 2001 murder of his second wife, Bonny Lee Bakley. In November 2005, he was found liable in a California civil court for her wrongful death.

Early life
Robert Blake was born Michael James Gubitosi in Nutley, New Jersey, on September 18, 1933.  His parents were Giacomo (James) Gubitosi and his wife, Elizabeth Cafone.  In 1930, James worked as a die setter for a can manufacturer. Eventually, Blake's parents began a song-and-dance act. In 1936, their three children began performing, billed as "The Three Little Hillbillies." They moved to Los Angeles, California, in 1938, where the children began working as movie extras.

Blake had an unhappy childhood in which he was abused by his alcoholic father. When he entered public school at age 10, he was bullied and had fights with other students, which led to his expulsion. Blake stated that he was physically and sexually abused by both of his parents while growing up and was frequently locked in a closet and forced to eat off the floor as punishment. At age 14, he ran away from home, leading to several more difficult years. His father died by suicide in 1956.

Child actor

Then known as "Mickey Gubitosi", Blake began his acting career as Toto in the MGM movie Bridal Suite (1939), starring Annabella and Robert Young. Blake then began appearing in MGM's Our Gang short subjects (a.k.a. The Little Rascals) under his real name, replacing Eugene "Porky" Lee. He appeared in 40 of the shorts between 1939 and 1944, eventually becoming the series' final lead character. Blake's parents also made appearances in the series as extras. In Our Gang, Blake's character, Mickey, was often called upon to cry, for which he was criticized for being unconvincing. He was also criticized for being obnoxious and whiny. In 1942, he acquired the stage name "Bobby Blake" and his character in the series was renamed "Mickey Blake." In 1944, MGM discontinued Our Gang, releasing the final short in the series, Dancing Romeo. In 1995, Blake was honored by the Young Artist Foundation with its Former Child Star "Lifetime Achievement" Award for his role in Our Gang. In 1942, Blake appeared as "Tooky" Stedman in Andy Hardy's Double Life.

In 1944, Blake began playing a Native American boy, "Little Beaver," in the Red Ryder western series at the studios of Republic Pictures (now CBS Radford Studios), appearing in twenty-three of the movies until 1947. He also had roles in one of Laurel and Hardy's later films The Big Noise (1944), and the Warner Bros. movies Humoresque (1946), playing John Garfield's character as a child, and The Treasure of the Sierra Madre (1948), playing the Mexican boy who sells Humphrey Bogart a winning lottery ticket and gets a glass of water thrown in his face by Bogart in the process. In 1950, at age 17, Blake appeared as Mahmoud in The Black Rose and as Enrico, Naples Bus Boy (uncredited) in Black Hand.

Career as an adult
In 1950, Blake was drafted into the United States Army. Upon leaving at the age of 21, he found himself without any job prospects and fell into a deep depression. This led to a two-year addiction to heroin and cocaine. He also sold drugs. Blake entered Jeff Corey's acting class and began working on improving his personal and professional life. He eventually became a seasoned Hollywood actor, playing notable dramatic roles in movies and on television. In 1956, he was billed as Robert Blake for the first time.

In 1959, Blake turned down the role of Little Joe Cartwright, a character ultimately portrayed by Michael Landon, in NBC's western television series Bonanza. He did appear that year as Tobe Hackett in the episode "Trade Me Deadly" of the syndicated western series 26 Men, which dramatized true stories of the Arizona Rangers. Blake also appeared twice as "Alfredo" in the syndicated western The Cisco Kid and starred in "The White Hat" episode of Men of Annapolis, another syndicated series. He appeared in three distinctive guest lead roles in the CBS series Have Gun Will Travel, as well as one-time guest roles on John Payne's NBC western The Restless Gun, Nick Adams's ABC western The Rebel, and in season 3, episode 25 of Bat Masterson, the NBC western series The Californians, the short-lived ABC adventure series Straightaway, and the NBC western television series Laramie.

Blake performed in numerous motion pictures as an adult, including the starring role in The Purple Gang (1960), a gangster movie, and featured roles in Pork Chop Hill (1959) and, as one of four U.S. soldiers participating in a gang rape in occupied Germany, in Town Without Pity (1961). He appeared in the John F. Kennedy war biopic PT 109 as Charles "Bucky" Harris (1963). He was also in Ensign Pulver (1964), The Greatest Story Ever Told (1965), and other films. Blake garnered further exposure as a member of the ensemble cast of the 1963 acclaimed but short-lived The Richard Boone Show, appearing in fifteen of the NBC series' 25 episodes.

In 1967, Blake experienced a career breakout due to his work in the film In Cold Blood. Blake played real-life murderer Perry Smith. Richard Brooks received two Oscar nominations for the film: one for his direction, and one for his adaptation of Truman Capote's book.With In Cold Blood, Blake was the first actor to utter the expletive "bullshit" in a mainstream American motion picture.

Blake played a Native American fugitive in Tell Them Willie Boy Is Here (1969), starred in a TV movie adaptation of Of Mice and Men (1981), and played a motorcycle highway patrolman in iconoclastic Electra Glide in Blue (1973). He played a small-town stock car driver with ambitions to join the NASCAR circuit in Corky,  which MGM produced in 1972. The film featured real NASCAR drivers, including Richard Petty and Cale Yarborough.

Blake may be best known for his Emmy Award-winning role of Tony Baretta in the popular television series Baretta (1975 to 1978), playing a street-wise, plain clothes police detective. The show's trademarks included Baretta's pet cockatoo "Fred" and his signature phrases—notably "That's the name of that tune", and "You can take that to the bank."

After Baretta ended, NBC offered to produce several pilot episodes of a proposed series titled Joe Dancer, in which Blake would play the role of a hard-boiled private detective. In addition to starring, Blake also was credited as the executive producer and creator. Three television films aired on NBC in 1981 and 1983, but a television series of "Joe Dancer" never materialized.

Blake had starring roles in a couple of films for Paramount Pictures, Coast to Coast (1980) and Second-Hand Hearts (1981). He continued to act through the 1980s and 1990s, mostly in television, in such roles as Jimmy Hoffa in the miniseries Blood Feud (1983) and as John List in the murder drama Judgment Day: The John List Story (1993), which earned him a third Emmy nomination. Blake starred in the 1985 television series Hell Town, playing a priest working in a tough neighborhood, and wrote the screenplay for the pilot as Lyman P. Docker. He also had character parts in the theatrical movies Money Train (1995) and played the Mystery Man in David Lynch's Lost Highway (1997), which turned out to be his last film role.

Marriages and children
Blake and actress Sondra Kerr were married in 1961, and divorced in 1983. It was his first marriage, from which came two children: actor Noah Blake (born 1965) and Delinah Blake (born 1966).

In 1999, Blake met Bonny Lee Bakley, formerly of Wharton, New Jersey, who had already been married nine times and reportedly had a history of exploiting older men, especially celebrities, for money. She was dating Christian Brando, the son of Marlon Brando, during her relationship with Blake. Bakley became pregnant and told both Brando and Blake that her baby was theirs. Initially, Bakley named the baby "Christian Shannon Brando" and stated that Brando was the father. Bakley wrote letters describing her dubious motives to Blake. Blake insisted that she take a DNA test to prove the paternity. Blake became Bakley's tenth husband on November 19, 2000, after DNA tests proved that Blake was the biological father of her child, who was renamed Rosie. Blake remained married to Bakley until she was murdered on May 4, 2001.

In a March 2016 interview at age 82, Blake indicated he had a new woman in his life, who remained unnamed. In 2017, Blake applied for a marriage license for his fiancée, Pamela Hudak, whom he had known for decades, and who had testified on his behalf at his trial. On December 7, 2018, it was announced that Blake had filed for divorce.

Murder of Bonny Lee Bakley
On May 4, 2001, Blake took Bakley out for dinner at Vitello's Italian Restaurant in Studio City, California. Bakley was fatally shot in the head while sitting in Blake's vehicle, which was parked on a side street around the corner from the restaurant. Blake claimed that he had returned to the restaurant to collect a pistol which he had left inside and said that he had not been present when the shooting took place. The pistol Blake left in the restaurant was found and determined by police not to be the murder weapon.

Arrest
On April 18, 2002, Blake was arrested and charged with Bakley's murder. His longtime bodyguard, Earle Caldwell, was also arrested and charged with conspiracy in connection with the murder. A key event that gave the Los Angeles Police Department the confidence to arrest Blake came when a retired stuntman, Ronald "Duffy" Hambleton, agreed to testify against him. Hambleton alleged that Blake tried to hire him to kill Bakley. Another retired stuntman and an associate of Hambleton's, Gary McLarty, also came forward with a similar story. According to author Miles Corwin, Hambleton had agreed to testify against Blake only after being told that he would be subject to a grand jury subpoena and a misdemeanor charge.

On April 22, 2002, Blake was charged with one count of murder with special circumstances, an offense which carried a possible death penalty. He was also charged with two counts of solicitation of murder and one count of conspiracy to commit murder. Blake entered a plea of not guilty. On March 13, 2003, after almost a year in jail, Blake was granted bail, which was set at $1.5 million. He was then placed under house arrest while awaiting trial. On October 31, in a major reversal for the prosecution, the judge dismissed the conspiracy charges against Blake and Caldwell during a pre-trial hearing. The junior prosecutor who handled the case, Shellie Samuels, was interviewed by CBS reporter Peter Van Sant for the CBS program 48 Hours Investigates. During the interview, broadcast in November 2003, she admitted that the prosecutors had no forensic evidence implicating Blake in the murder and that they could not tie him to the murder weapon.

Trial and acquittal
Blake's criminal trial for murder began on December 20, 2004, with opening statements by the prosecution and opening statements by the defense the following day. The prosecution contended that Blake intentionally murdered Bakley to free himself from a loveless marriage, while the defense claimed that Blake was an innocent victim of circumstantial and fabricated evidence. McLarty and Hambleton each testified that Blake had asked them to murder Bakley. On cross-examination, the defense brought up McLarty's mental health problems and Hambleton's criminal history. The lack of gunshot residue on Blake's hands was a key part of the defense's case that Blake was not the shooter. Blake chose not to testify.

On March 16, 2005, Blake was found not guilty of murder and not guilty of one of the two counts of solicitation of murder. The other count, for solicitation to commit murder, was dropped after it was revealed that the jury was deadlocked 11–1 in favor of an acquittal. Los Angeles District Attorney Stephen Cooley, commenting on this ruling, called Blake "a miserable human being" and the jurors "incredibly stupid" to fall for the defense's claims. Public opinion regarding the verdict was mixed, with some feeling that Blake was guilty, though many felt that there was not enough evidence to convict him. On the night of his acquittal several fans celebrated at Blake's favorite haunt – and the scene of the crime – Vitello's.

Civil case
Bakley's three children filed a civil suit against Blake, asserting that he was responsible for their mother's death. During the trial, the girlfriend of Blake's co-defendant Earle Caldwell said she believed Blake and Caldwell were involved in the crime.

On November 18, 2005, a jury found Blake liable for the wrongful death of his wife and ordered him to pay $30 million. On February 3, 2006, Blake filed for bankruptcy.

Blake's attorney, M. Gerald Schwartzbach, appealed the court's decision on February 28, 2007. On April 26, 2008, an appeals court upheld the civil case verdict, but cut Blake's penalty assessment to $15 million.

Aftermath
Blake maintained a low profile after his acquittal and filing for bankruptcy, with debts of $3 million for unpaid legal fees as well as state and federal taxes.  On April 9, 2010, the state of California filed a tax lien against Blake for $1,110,878 in unpaid back taxes.

On July 16, 2012, Blake was interviewed on CNN's Piers Morgan Tonight. When asked about the night of Bakley's murder, Blake became defensive and angry, stating he resented Morgan's questioning and felt he was being interrogated. Morgan responded he was only asking questions that he felt people were eager to have answered.

In January 2019, Blake was interviewed by 20/20. Initially, he seemed to decline the interview and instead delegated it to a friend, but then began to participate, discussing the murder and the behavior of the police officers who dealt with him, the culture of Hollywood and its reaction to the event, and his early life and difficulties with his parents.

In September 2019, Blake started a YouTube channel titled "Robert Blake: I ain't dead yet, so stay tuned," on which he discussed his life and career.

Later in October the same year, Blake's daughter, Rose Lenore, opened up about her childhood and how the trial affected her. She discussed reuniting with her father, visiting her mother's grave and her own desire to get into acting. Regarding knowing the truth about her mother's murder and whether Blake did it she declined to know the details but is open to knowing the truth "If it's ever an option".

In 2021, Blake opened up a website, "Robert Blake's Pushcart", where scripts, memorabilia, and books including his autobiography Tales of a Rascal are available to read and in the case of the latter can be ordered. 

Quentin Tarantino's novel Once Upon a Time in Hollywood, based on his film of the same name, is dedicated to Blake. Notably, Blake's later life dealing with his wife's murder mirrors Brad Pitt's character Cliff Booth who is also accused of murdering his wife.

Death
Blake died from heart disease in Los Angeles, on March 9, 2023, at the age of 89.

Comedian Jimmy Kimmel made
a comment at the 95th Academy Awards on March 12, 2023, that was deemed inappropriate and insensitive after the actor's recent death. On the topic of whether or not Blake should be included in the annual "In Memoriam" montage, Kimmel stated;

"Everybody please get out your phones, it is time to vote, even at home, if you think Robert Blake should be included in the "In Memoriam" montage, text "GIMME-A-Blake", to the number on your screen or any number"

Filmography

Film

Television

References

Further reading 
 Holmstrom, John. The Moving Picture Boy: An International Encyclopaedia from 1895 to 1995, Norwich, Michael Russell, 1996, pp. 185–186.
 Dye, David. Child and Youth Actors: Filmography of Their Entire Careers, 1914–1985. Jefferson, NC: McFarland & Co., 1988, p. 20–22.

External links

 

1933 births
2023 deaths
20th-century American male actors
American male child actors
American male comedy actors
American male film actors
American male television actors
American people of Italian descent
Best Drama Actor Golden Globe (television) winners
Male actors from New Jersey
Male Western (genre) film actors
Our Gang
Outstanding Performance by a Lead Actor in a Drama Series Primetime Emmy Award winners
People acquitted of murder
People from Nutley, New Jersey
Western (genre) television actors